| known_for          = 
| net_worth          = 
| television         = 
| title              = 
| partner            = 
| father             = Bishop Welcome Simelane
| children           = 1
}}

Bongekile Mildred Simelane (born July 26, 1994), better known as Babes Wodumo is a South African gqom artist and choreographer. She rose to fame following the release of her breakthrough song "Wololo", in 2016. The song later appeared on her debut studio album, Gqom Queen, released in late 2016.

Babes Wodumo  is a part of the music connoisseurs who were pivotal in influencing the genre's international acclaim included the likes of South African rapper Okmalumkoolkat, Italian record label Gqom Oh owner, Malumqawz Kole inclusive of music taste-makeraand public relations liaison, Cherish Lala Mankai and Afrotainment record label owner DJ Tira.  She appeared on Black Panther: The Album on a song called "Redemption".
In 2017, Wodumo was nominated for the BET Award for Best International Act: Africa. In July 2020, she released her second album Idando Kazi with the hit single Elamont ft Mampintsha and skillz.

Life and career

1994-2013: Early childhood
Bongekile Mildred Simelane was born in March 25, 1994, Lamontville,  Durban. Her father Welcome Simelane is a Bishop.

2014-2019: Career beginnings, breakthrough,  Black Panther 
She released  her first song titled "Desha" produced by Sir Bubzin, In 2014. After she signed a record deal with West Ink, her breakthrough hit single "Wololo" featuring Mampintsha was released in December 2015 in South Africa. The song earned her nomination for Best Breakthrough Artist and Song of the Year at MTV Africa Music Awards.

Her debut studio album Gqom Queen Vol. 1 blended with Gqom was released. The album proceeded with three singles  "Wololo", "Umgan Wami" and "Mercedes". Upon its release the song surpassed 28 million streams and debuted at number 3 on iTunes charts. The album was certified platinum  (RiSA) for South Africa sales 30 0000.

Her album created her the opportunity to feature on the Black Panther album by Kendrick Lamar.

2020-present: Idando Kazi
On 24 July 2020, she released her second studio album Idando Kazi‘’under Sabusiswa Genius Ncube’s Management at West Ink Records, features Mampintsha, Skillz, T.N.S,Madanon,Worst Behavior and many others. The "eLamont" was released as the lead single of the album features Mampintsha and Skillz debuted at number 3 on South African iTunes charts.

Babes Wodumo got congratulations flood her timeline after announcing the huge win her debut album, Gqom Queen Vol 1 bagged.

The singer alongside her lover, Mampintsha, who is West Ink record label boss, announced the exciting news on social media.

At 27th South African Music Awards Idando Kazi received a nominations. In 2021 she and his husband launched their reality show Uthando Lodumo which airs on Showmax.

Personal life
Domestic violence case
On 3 March 2019, reports surfaced that Wodumo's boyfriend and manager Mandla "Mampintsha" Maphumulo had physically assaulted her. Wodumo broadcast the incident on Instagram Live. Mampintsha was arrested on suspicion of assault. Even though the relationship between the two had appeared to be over, both parties agreed to counselling and reconciled and are on good terms, with Mampintsha appearing on her second album Idando Kazi.

 Marriage and children 
Babes Wodumo married Mandla Maphumulo in 2020. In 2021 they had their first child, even though Babes' parents didn't know.  They have a reality show, "uthando lodumo," which premiered on Showmax channel (495). Her husband later passed away in December 2022, due to a stroke

SAMAs
In 2017, Wodumo was the most nominated artist at the 23rd South African Music Awards. However, she did not win any award, and this led to an altercation after the singer accused the personnel from the SAMA 23 of buying awards.

Discography
 Studio albums
In 2016, Babes released her breakthrough album where she featured Mampintsha in all the songs on the project. The album also features Nigerian superstar D'banj, Madanon, Cassper Nyovest, DJ Sox, Sparks Wabantwana, Scoop, Kholwane, Khuzani, Danger, and DJ Tira

In July 2020, she released her second project, titled Indando Kazi, where she featured mostly Mampintsha on 10 out of the 13 tracks. Other artists include RockBoy, Cultivated Soulz & Sizwe Mdlalose, Rhythm Soundz, Dladla Mshunqisi, Her all time friend Madanon and Tipcee, among others.

Singles

Awards and nominations

|-
|rowspan="3" | 16th Metro FM Music Awards
|Gqom Queen Vol.1
|Best Dance Album
|
|-
|Gqom Queen Vol.1
|Best Female Album
|
|-
|Wololo (feat. Mampintsha & Distruction Boyz
|Song Of The Year)
|
|-
|rowspan="5" | 23rd South African Music Awards
|Herself
|Newcomer Of The Year
|
|-
|Female Artist Of The Year 
|Herself
|
|-
|Wololo (feat. Mampintsha & Distruction Boyz)
|Record Of The Year
|
|-
|Gqom Queen Vol.1
|Album of the Year
|
|-
|Female Artist Of The Year
|Herself 
|
|-
|rowspan="1" | MTV Africa Music Awards 2016
|Song Of The Year
|Wololo (feat. Mampintsha and Distruction Boyz)
|
|-
|rowspan="1" | BET Awards 2017
|Herself
|Best International Act: Africa
|
|-
|rowspan="1" | Dance Music Awards 2017
|Gqom Queen Vol.1
|Best Dance Female Artist
|
|-
|rowspan="1" | 2017MTV EMA
|Herself
|Best African Act
|
|-
|rowspan="1" | All African Music Awards 2018
|Herself
|Best Female Artiste in Southern Africa
|
|-
|rowspan="4" | South African Gqom Awards 2019
|Ka Dazz
|Song Of The Year
|
|-
|Herself
|Best Female
|
|-
|Ka Dazz
|Best Music Video
|
|-
|Ka Dazz
|Best Music Video Director
|
|-
|27th South African Music Awards
| Idando Kazi''
| Best Gqom Album
|
|}

References 

Living people
People from Durban
21st-century South African women singers
1994 births